Paykan is the Iranian-made automobile.

Paykan may also refer to:
 The Iranian missile boat Paykan
 Paykan Tehran F.C., An Iranian football club based in Tehran